The year 1894 in architecture involved some significant events.

Events
 In the United States, the Society of Beaux-Arts Architects is founded.
 Anatole de Baudot designs the church of Saint-Jean-de-Montmartre in Paris as the first to use a reinforced concrete frame.

Buildings and structures

Buildings opened

 April 21 – Quatro de Setembro Theater, Teresina, Brazil.
 May 14 – Blackpool Tower in Blackpool, England, completed to a design by Maxwell and Tuke and opened to the public.
 June 30 – Tower Bridge in London, designed by Horace Jones (architect) and John Wolfe-Barry.
 July
 Dalen Hotel in Norway, designed by Haldor Børve.
 Palais Galliera in Paris, designed by Léon Ginain.
 October 16 – Hessisches Staatstheater Wiesbaden, designed by Fellner & Helmer.

Buildings completed

 Kapelle der Versöhnung, Berlin, Germany.
 Mary, Queen of the World Cathedral, Montreal, Canada.
 Reformed Church, Dresden, designed by Harald Julius von Bosse (demolished 1963).
 Ringkirche, Wiesbaden, designed by Johannes Otzen.
 Sacred Heart Church (Kőszeg, Hungary), designed by Ludwig Schöne.
 St. Peter's Church, Jaffa.
 Colegio de Santa Maria de Jesús in Barcelona, Spain, designed by Antoni Gaudí.
 Columbus Hall (school and theater)  in Orange, NJ designed by Jeremiah O'Rourke.
 Antiguo Cuartel Militar Español de Ponce, Puerto Rico.
 Sisters of Charity Hospital, Zagreb, Croatia.
 Reichstag in Berlin, designed by Paul Wallot.
 Royal Museum of Fine Arts, Antwerp, designed by Jean-Jacques Winders and Frans Van Dijk.
 Guaranty Building, Buffalo, New York, designed by Louis Sullivan.
 Hôtel Tassel (town house), Brussels, designed by Victor Horta.
 Hurlbut Memorial Gate, Detroit, Michigan, USA.
 Lululaund, a house for Hubert von Herkomer at Bushey, England, based on a design by Henry Hobson Richardson (d. 1886) (demolished 1939).
 Rebuilt Köln Hauptbahnhof railway station in Cologne, Germany, designed by E. Grüttefie (engineer) and Georg Frentzen (architect).
 Negril Lighthouse, Jamaica.
 De Arend, Coevorden (smock mill), Netherlands.

Awards
 RIBA Royal Gold Medal – Frederic Leighton.
 Grand Prix de Rome, architecture: Alfred-Henri Recoura.

Births
 February 18 – Paul Williams, California-based architect (died 1980)

Deaths
 April 11 – Constantin Lipsius, German architect and architectural theorist (born 1832)
 June 27 – Giorgio Costantino Schinas, Maltese architect and civil engineer (born 1834)
 August 15 – Arthur Rotch, Boston-based architect (born 1850)
 September 16 – Eduard Mezger,  Bavarian architect, painter, professor and high civil officer of the royal buildings administration (born 1807)
 December 16 – Alexandru Orăscu, Romanian Neoclassicist architect (born 1817)

References